Molodniki is a rural locality (a village) in Kupriyanovskoye Rural Settlement, Gorokhovetsky District, Vladimir Oblast, Russia. The population was 3 as of 2010.

Geography 
Molodniki is located on the Sukhodol River, 13 km south of Gorokhovets (the district's administrative centre) by road. Pogost is the nearest rural locality.

References 

Rural localities in Gorokhovetsky District